Paliampela, known before 1928 as Lozyano, is a village of the Pydna-Kolindros municipality. Before the 2011 local government reform it was part of the municipality of Kolindros. The 2011 census recorded 210 inhabitants in the village.

See also
 List of settlements in the Pieria regional unit

References

Populated places in Pieria (regional unit)